Susan Gal (born 1949) is the Mae & Sidney G. Metzl Distinguished Service Professor of Anthropology, of Linguistics, and of Social Sciences at the University of Chicago She is the author or co-author of several books and numerous articles on linguistic anthropology, gender and politics, and the social history of Eastern Europe.

Education and career 
Gal received her B.A. in psychology and anthropology from Barnard College in 1970 and received her Ph.D. from the University of California, Berkeley in 1976. She taught at Rutgers University from 1977 to 1994, and then moved to the University of Chicago, serving as the Chair of the Department of Anthropology between 1999 and 2002.

Honors and awards 
Gal received the Simon Guggenheim Memorial Fellowship in 2002 for the study of language ideologies and political authority during and after socialism, and has been awarded the SSRC-ACLS International Fellowship, as well as Fulbright  and NIMH Fellowships.

In 2007 Gal was elected to the American Academy of Arts and Sciences.

Gal is a member of the editorial board of American Anthropologist.

Research 
Her first book, Language Shift: Social Determinants of Linguistic Change in Bilingual Austria, was published in 1979 and examined the linguistic situation of a Hungarian minority in the town of Burgenland, Austria. As Richard Coates states in his review of the book, the book argues that "language shift is essentially a symbolic change correlated with the changing relative status of the value-systems which each language symbolizes, and not a simple function of industrialization, urbanization or some other large-scale social change." Gal co-wrote the book The Politics of Gender After Socialism (2000) with Gail Kligman, which won the 2001 Heldt Prize (awarded by the American Association for the Advancement of Slavic Studies), and co-edited the anthology Reproducing Gender: Politics, Publics, and Everyday Life after Socialism with Kligman. These books examine the complex relationship between ideas and practices of gender and political economic change, taking the post-Soviet transition across a number of East Central European countries as case studies.

Selected publications

References

American women anthropologists
University of California, Berkeley alumni
University of Chicago faculty
Fellows of the American Academy of Arts and Sciences
Living people
1949 births
American women academics
21st-century American women
Women linguists
Barnard College alumni
Linguists from the United States
20th-century linguists
20th-century American anthropologists
21st-century linguists
21st-century American anthropologists